5x2 (also Cinq fois deux) is a 2004 French film directed by François Ozon, which uncovers the back story to the gradual disintegration of a middle class marriage by depicting five key moments in the relationship, but in reverse order.

Plot
A young married couple, Gilles and Marion, are in a lawyer's office.  The lawyer reads out the formal terms of their separation.  Then, they book a hotel room together. We then go back in time, with the second chapter showing a tense dinner party, at which Gilles appears to admit to infidelity.  The third chapter shows their son's birth, which Gilles missed by several hours, leaving Marion in the hospital with only her parents.  The fourth chapter shows their wedding day.  The final chapter takes place at an Italian beach resort, where their relationship began.

The individual chapters  are all punctuated by romantic Italian love songs, which Ozon has said he chose for their "over-the-top sentimentality" and in order to offset the darkness of some of the scenes in the film. Ozon has also said that the backward structure of the story was in part inspired by Jane Campion's 1986 film Two Friends, and that it allowed for "a true, lucid reading of a couple's story".

Cast
Valeria Bruni Tedeschi as Marion
Stéphane Freiss as Gilles
Géraldine Pailhas as Valérie
Françoise Fabian as Monique
Michael Lonsdale as Bernard
Antoine Chappey as Christophe Ferrond
Marc Ruchmann as Mathieu

Production
Stéphane Freiss said the hotel rape sequence with Valeria Bruni Tedeschi was 'pretty hardcore', explaining that in the screenplay this scene was only a few lines long (it said 'they make love') and revealing that after filming François Ozon said to the actors he wasn't expecting them to give so much.

References

External links
5x2 at Francois-Ozon.com

2004 films
2000s French-language films
French nonlinear narrative films
Films directed by François Ozon
2004 romantic drama films
French romantic drama films
2000s French films